"Want Me, Want Me" is Namie Amuro's 28th solo single under the Avex Trax label. It was released in two formats CD and CD&DVD on April 6, 2005. The CD format contained a B-side track and its instrumental while the CD&DVD format had no B-side but came with the music video. It was the last retailed single to precede her sixth studio album, Queen of Hip-Pop (2005).

History
Amuro was a guest at the 2005 Kobe Collection, an important fashion event, and the song was unveiled for the first time at the latter. In an interview for the May 2005 edition of Woofin' Magazine, the singer revealed that Want Me, Want Me was a song she had already planned for her next album, but she really liked it and therefore decided to release it as a single.

Song information
"Want Me, Want Me" is best described as a fusion of bhangra and reggaeton music. Its arrangement and composition is most similar to reggaeton music, but it utilizes a sitar sample. The single debuted at #2 and opened with her largest sales figure for a single since her 2001 hit, "lovin' it (Namie Amuro & Verbal)."

Music video
The video for "Want Me, Want Me" was shot in an undisclosed studio by director Masashi Muto. It involves Amuro and several dancers performing in a flooded room. The room changes between two colors, blue and beige. Extras of various ethnic backgrounds were used as background dancers throughout the video.

Track listing
CD only format

CD and DVD

Personnel
Namie Amuro – vocals, background vocals
Michico – background vocals
Sugi-V – all instruments

Production
Producers – Sugi-V, Michico
Vocal Production – Michico
Mixing – D.O.I
Music Video Director – Masashi Muto
Hair & Make Up – Akemi Nakano
Stylist – Noriko Goto
Photography – Shoji Uchida
Design: Aratame

TV performances
March 24, 2005 – Kobe Collection '05
April 2, 2005 – CDTV
April 9, 2005 – Music Fighter
April 14, 2005 – Utaban
April 22, 2005 – Music Station
June 4, 2005 – MTV Video Awards Japan 2005

Cover versions
 Shaan & Sunidhi Chauhan recorded an Indian version for the Bollywood film, Darling, titled 'Aa Khushi Se Khud Khushi Kar Le'. A remix of the song was also released.
 Rica Peralejo, a Filipino singer covered the song titled 'Gumalaw Na' in the album, Bollywood Fever (2006).
 Mina recorded a Korean version, titled 'Istanbul'.
The sitar sample from the song was also featured in the background music to the cycle 8 premiere episode of America's Next Top Model.

Charts
Oricon Sales Chart (Japan)

RIAJ certification
"Want Me, Want Me" has been certified gold for shipments of over 100,000 by the Recording Industry Association of Japan.

References

2005 singles
Namie Amuro songs
Avex Trax singles
2005 songs